Valcău de Jos is a commune in Sălaj County, Crișana, Romania. It is composed of six villages: Lazuri (Újvágás), Preoteasa (Füzespaptelek), Ratovei (Rátonbükk), Sub Cetate (Valkóváralja), Valcău de Jos and Valcău de Sus (Felsővalkó). It is 14 km southwest of Șimleu Silvaniei.

History
Its name comes from the Slavic word vlk ("wolf"). Its Hungarian name Alsóvalkó means "Lower Valkó"; before 1899 it was called Magyarvalkó. Felsővalkó ("Upper Valkó") is now Valcău de Sus. Its castle was built in the late 13th century, and was unlawfully occupied by Dezső Elefánti in 1312. King Sigismund of Luxemburg laid siege to it in 1404. In 1665 the Ottoman army destroyed it and it was not rebuilt again.

Population
In 1910 the village had 900 residents, with a Romanian majority and a significant Hungarian minority. 

In 2002 the commune of which Valcău de Jos is the administrative center had 3302 inhabitants: 2,909 Romanians, 287 Roma, 105 Hungarians, and one Slovak.

Natives
Lucian Bode
Ioan Sârca

Sights
 Reformed Church in Valcău de Jos, built in the 19th century (1896), historic monument
 Valcău Citadel, medieval fortress built in the 13th century, historic monument

References

Communes in Sălaj County
Localities in Crișana